Sempervivum × giuseppii, the roof houseleek, is a naturally-occurring hybrid species of flowering plant in the family Crassulaceae, native to northwest Spain. Its parents are Sempervivum arachnoideum × Sempervivum cantabricum. A succulent, cold hardy to USDA zone 7, it has gained the Royal Horticultural Society's Award of Garden Merit.

References

giuseppii
Interspecific plant hybrids
Succulent plants
Endemic flora of Spain
Plants described in 1941